Vaaranam Aayiram is a 2008 Indian Tamil-language action drama film written and directed by Gautham Vasudev Menon and produced by Venu Ravichandran of Aascar Films. The film stars Suriya in dual lead roles as father and son, with Sameera Reddy (in her Tamil debut), Simran and Divya Spandana in lead roles. The film features music composed by Harris Jayaraj, making Vaaranam Aayiram his final project with Menon before the formal break-up of their partnership, until they worked together again in Yennai Arindhaal (2015). Cinematography for the film has been handled by R. Rathnavelu and editing done by Anthony Gonsalvez.

The film illustrates Surya, an Indian Army Major who learns about his father's death when he is on a rescue mission. He then starts reminiscing about the bond he shared with his father and the stories related to him. The storyline is inspired from Menon's life, when he heard the news about his father's death back in 2007, also serving as a tribute to him. Filmed across India and United States, Vaaranam Aayiram had been under production since November 2006 and was completed in August 2008. The film was theatrically released on 14 November 2008, after multiple postponements and opened to critical acclaim and praise for Suriya's performance. Further, the film also became a commercial success, eventually becoming the biggest hit in Suriya's career at that time. It won a number of awards, including the National Film Award for Best Feature Film in Tamil.

Plot 
An elderly Krishnan vomits blood and passes away at his house. His son Suriya, an Indian Army Major, is on his way to Kashmir on a rescue mission to rescue a journalist kidnapped by terrorists. He learns of his father's demise and tearfully reminisces memories of his past with his father.

Krishnan and Malini are both students at Madras Christian College in the 1970s. They fall in love and later get married; Suriya and his sister Shriya are born. Krishnan and Suriya get along more as friends than a father-son duo. Years later, after completing his exams in Trichy, Suriya meets Meghna on a train back home and falls head over heels for her, but Meghna doesn't believe in love at first sight. Suriya soon learns that she is leaving for California to pursue her master's degree.

Meanwhile, Krishnan suffers his first heart attack due to chain smoking. Reality strikes Suriya that he needs to be responsible in order to take care of his family. He starts a design firm with his friends and also performs at concerts to earn money. Suriya and his sister earn enough to complete their father's dream home. Later, taking his father's advice, Suriya tracks down Meghna in San Francisco. Though surprised by his presence, Meghna makes him stay with her. She eventually starts to fall in love with him. Convinced that Suriya is the right guy and also because her father would accept a person like him, Meghna proposes to Suriya much to his and his family's delight. She then leaves for Oklahoma City on a project. However, the Oklahoma City bombing takes place, in which Meghna is killed, leaving Suriya hysterical and heartbroken.

A depressed Suriya returns to India and meets a businessman Shankar Menon on the way. He consoles and encourages him. Weeks pass by; Suriya tries hanging out with friends, and meets Priya, Shriya's friend. She proposes to Suriya and confesses that she was in love right from their childhood, but Suriya does not reciprocate right away; in fact, her proposal just causes Suriya to have a painful relapse of Meghna's memories to the point that he starts using drugs and alcohol to ease his pain. Malini and Krishnan find out about his drug abuse and lock him up in his room to rehabilitate him. Once he starts withdrawing, Malini encourages Suriya to go on a rejuvenating trip but on a condition that he returns home. Suriya travels to Kashmir, where he learns that Aditya, Shankar Menon's son, has been kidnapped in Delhi. He decides to find Aditya and after days of roaming the city and investigating, he finds Dabbu Malik who directs him to the kidnapper, Asad. With no preparation and falling into all mess alone, he overpowers them intelligently and rescues Aditya. He receives critical praise from around the country and from his family upon his return home.

Suriya realizes that the only way to forget the pain of Meghna's memories is to train his body and prepare for bigger things. He goes on a strict workout and joins the Indian army as a commissioned officer. Now as Major K. Suriya, after six years, he meets Priya in Dehradun. She proposes again and this time he reciprocates; they get married and eventually have a son. Suddenly, Krishnan is diagnosed with throat cancer due to his smoking habit and is given a year to live. A few days later, Suriya is called upon to go on a mission to rescue a journalist, which brings the scene back to the present day.

The military mission is completed successfully and Suriya returns home victorious and tearfully honours Krishnan and performs his last rites. Suriya, Shriya, Malini and Priya pour Krishnan's ashes into the sea and Malini encourages Suriya to move on in life with his family by telling him that he is "the conqueror of a thousand elephants" just like his father, who conquered Malini and made her his life. Suriya looks back and says that his father is still with them. The film ends with an image of Krishnan smiling at them and walking gleefully along the shores.

Cast 

 Suriya in dual role as 
Krishnan (Suriya and Shriya's father)
Major K.Suriya 
Varun as three-year-old Suriya
Hiren as six-year-old Suriya
Sachin as eleven-year-old Suriya
 Sameera Reddy as Meghna, Suriya's ex-girlfriend (Voice dubbed by Chinmayi)
 Simran as Malini Krishnan, Krishnan's wife and Suriya and Shriya's mother (Voice dubbed by Deepa Venkat)
 Divya Spandana as Priya (Shriya's best friend who turned Suriya's wife)
 Deepa Narendran as Shriya Krishnan, Suriya's sister
Laasya as five-year-old Shriya
 Babloo Prithiveeraj as Asad
 Avishek Karthik as Mahesh
 Ajay as Ajay
 Akanksha Midha as Namradha Dutt
 Jayshree as Aarthi
 Dany as Priya's father
 Ganesh as Shriya's husband
 Deenadalayan as Shankar Dayal Sharma
 Gautham Vasudev Menon as Commando Informer
 Indra as Priya's mother
 Ganesh as Librarian Antony
 Ravi as Daboo Mauik
 Rajeevan as Meghna's father
 Shanker Kolandi as Shankar Menon
 Swetha as Swetha
 Sathish as Sathish
 Veera Bahu as Commando
 Aditya as Aditya
 Amitash as Krishnan's friend

Production

Pre-production 
Director Gautham Vasudev Menon expressed his interest to work with Suriya again after the success of Kaakha Kaakha (2003). In early 2005, the pair got together for a film tentatively titled Chennaiyil Oru Mazhaikaalam which featured Asin in the lead role and Daniel Balaji in a supporting role. However, after a photo shoot, the film was delayed and then subsequently called off, with Menon later went on to direct the Kamal Haasan-starrer Vettaiyaadu Vilaiyaadu and Sarathkumar's Pachaikili Muthucharam. In mid-2006, Menon planned a script for Suriya, which will be produced under his newly launched Photon Film Factory, and he expressed that the film will not be a sequel to Kaakha Kaakha, but a romantic thriller film with titles such as Naan Thaan and Udal Porul Aavi were considered. In a turn of events, Gautham Menon dropped the idea of producing the film due to budget escalations, and this prompted Ravichandran to acquire the production rights.

Development 
In late November 2006, Menon announced the title of the film as Vaaranam Aayiram, title derived from "Nachiyar Tirumoli" with the literal meaning of "the strength of a thousand elephants". According to Menon, he received the news of his father's death while he was in the United States in 2007, and recounted their shared experiences while returning via flight; this incident inspired him to direct the film which begins in a similar manner. Vaaranam Aayiram was believed to be based on the Dutch film Character by Mike van Diem; while others have claimed that it is inspired by the 1994 Hollywood film, Forrest Gump, starring Tom Hanks. Menon too admitted the film will draw inspirations from Forrest Gump but would be fixed to suit the Indian audience. Furthermore, Menon stated that the film will be society themed. Menon has described the film as "autobiographical and a very personal story and if people didn't know, that 70% of this [the film] is from my life".

Casting 
Menon stated that Suriya will be seen playing the dual roles of a 21-year-old Suriya and his father Krishnan. Suriya lost weight without using capsules and prepared a six-pack for the film through an eight-month fitness regime. For Surya's father Krishnan's role, Menon initially approached both Mohanlal and Nana Patekar, but it did not work out as there was an issue about how they would portray the character's younger age (his twenties) in the flashback scenes, thus Suriya expressed interest in portraying the character himself. Deepika Padukone was first approached for the role, but she backed out to be part of the Bollywood film Om Shanti Om. Soon after, Andrea Jeremiah was confirmed as the heroine after working with the director in Pachaikili Muthucharam, but was dropped from the film for unknown reasons. Asin Thottumkal, who earlier been a part of Menon's shelved film Chennaiyil Oru Mazhaikkalam, expressed her desire to be a part of the project, but Suriya refuted her offer citing that she had walked out of his previous film, Sillunu Oru Kadhal and refused to act opposite him.

The producers then announced the film with Divya Spandana, who was making her comeback to Tamil films and Genelia D'Souza in the lead roles. Soon after the start of the shoot, Genelia decided to walk out, after Menon refused to pay the hefty salary that she was demanding and receiving in Telugu films, allowing Sameera Reddy to act in her first Tamil film. Simran, who acted alongside Suriya in Nerukku Ner (1997), signed and completed her shoots swiftly after she was selected to portray the mother of Suriya, after Tabu had rejected the role. Menon's norm technicians: cinematographer R. Rathnavelu, editor Anthony Gonsalvez, art director Rajeevan and music composer Harris Jayaraj, were part of this film.

Filming 

The shooting of the film commenced without a leading lady on 24 November 2006 at a nightclub in Chennai. In April 2007, it was announced that a 10-day shoot in Afghanistan would be followed by shooting in Malaysia, Russia and the United States, thus Vaaranam Aayiram was the first Tamil film being shot in Afghanistan. However, the film only completed a shoot at the University of California in Berkeley and shooting was not held in Afghanistan. Sameera Reddy, who announced as the leading lady, joined the schedule in United States, where major sequences of the film being shot. In November 2007, Gautham Menon decided to send the reels back to Chennai from San Francisco. Two of the production managers were assigned the task of bringing the reels to the producer's office. But they stayed in Singapore for a couple of days before returning to Chennai. Following their arrival, it was understood the reels went missing in the hotel they stayed in at Singapore, but a search by the police proved unsuccessful. The whole crew was in a fix as the reels held fight scenes, songs and other scenes worth $500,000 ( crore). Soon after, the reels were found with the Singapore airport authorities.

The team later shot few schedules in Chennai during January 2008 and was completed within a month. In April 2008, a song was filmed by an assistant cameraman with a high-tech camera, costing about Rs. 1.5 crore, fastened to his hip. While the assistant was moving behind the actors canning the shots, he tripped unexpectedly and the camera broke to pieces. The shot resumed a day later with a similar camera. The team further shot sequences in Kashmir and Delhi, and continued intermittently so that Suriya could work on his commitments for Ayan. The film finished its shoot in August 2008, after one year of production.

Music 

The film has seven songs composed by Harris Jayaraj with lyrics written by Thamarai and Na. Muthukumar. The original soundtrack album, distributed by Sony BMG, featured an instrumental track not included in the film. The songs from the albums were released to four leading radio stations in Chennai, with one song per station, in attempt to popularise it five days before the official launch on 24 September 2008, which was the first of its kind in Indian cinema. The album opened to positive response from music critics and audiences and became the most downloaded Tamil album during that time, and was considered to be one of the best albums of that decade. It became the most played and repeated soundtracks within the arrival of music streaming platforms in the Indian music scene.

Release 
Varanam Aayiram was initially scheduled for late 2007 release, but was delayed multiple times due to production troubles. On the occasion of Pongal (14 January 2008), a song trailer of 50-seconds was unveiled and opened to widespread response from fans. As a result, various distributors planned to buy the film for huge bids, with Gemini Film Circuit acquiring the Tamil Nadu theatrical distribution rights. Since, Venu Ravichandran prioritised on the release plans for Dasavathaaram scheduled for 14 April 2008 (Tamil New Year's Day), the team planned to release the film on 15 May 2008 and later shifted the release date to 30 May and 6 June. But the producer felt that the business of both the films will be affected due to the inaugural Indian Premier League season happening underway, thus resulting in holding both the releases till 1 June, the date when the tournament ends.

Despite the release of Dasavathaaram on 13 June 2008, Ravichandran and Menon did not comment anything about its release. Trade analysts believed that the collections will be affected if the film being released on June—July period, due to lack of festival dates in that month; adding to the factors of postponement, were the beginning of new academic sessions in mid-June, with the delay in the film's production as the team were able to complete the shooting only in August 2008. The makers preferred for a release on 15 August (Independence Day) and 3 September (Vinayagar Chathurthi), to cash in the holiday season, which did not happen. During October 2008, the members of Hindu Makkal Katchi demanded a ban on the film citing that its lead actress Divya Spandana's comments during the Hogenakkal Falls water dispute, as she attended the similar protest in Karnataka and condemned Tamils in the same issue.

The film was postponed further from 25 October 2008 (Diwali weekend) as Gautham Menon later sold the distribution rights from Gemini Film Circuit to Adlabs in order to ensure a wide release. The film released theatrically on 14 November 2008 along with its Telugu-dubbed version titled Surya s/o Krishnan was released simultaneously. Kalaignar TV acquired the film's satellite rights for hugh price. Before its release, the film's title had appeared on film websites' "most awaited" lists.

Reception

Box office 
The film emerged as the biggest blockbuster for Suriya after Ghajini, grossing 5.66 crore in Chennai alone. Vaaranam Aayiram collected £81,149 in the UK after its third weekend which then was approximately equal to 60.78 lakh. The film grossed $796,297 from Malaysia and $124,710 from the United Kingdom in its lifetime.

Critical response 
Sify stated that it is a "film straight from the heart being optimistic, fresh and emotionally honest". The review further stated "The film demands great patience to sit through and is an overdose of emotions. If the film holds on, it is because of its music and superb performance of Surya." Indiaglitz reviewed that it "proves to be a tame affair" but stated that "Suriya the actor rocks throughout". Behindwoods wrote: "what could have been a subtly told story turns into a sloppy fare" and "there are touching and heart-warming moments in the movie but, they are few and far between". Rediff.com's Pavithra Srinivasan called it a "moving story", further mentioning that "It might be just a feather in Gautam's hat. As for Surya, it's an ostrich plume, a justified triumph." Malathi Rangarajan of The Hindu said, "The same combo came together for Kaakha Kaakha and signed off with a flourish not so long ago! Of course Vaaranam [...] does have some great moments, but it's a lengthy film, and you feel it!" Prominent Indian film websites (including Rediff, Sify and Behindwoods) named Vaaranam Aayiram one of the 10 best Tamil films of 2008.

Accolades

Legacy 
The song "Mundhinam Paarthene" inspired a romantic film of the same name. In the film Idharkuthane Aasaipattai Balakumara (2013), Baby (Jangiri Madhumitha) has the song "Mundhinam Paarthene" as her ringtone. In Tamizh Padam 2, Shiva (Shiva) tries to go to America to win his girlfriend Ramya (Iswarya Menon) back, similar to how Suriya went to America to impress Meghna. In Master (2021), the character JD (Vijay) references dialogues from Vaaranam Aayiram as he tries to fool someone into believing that he once travelled to America to proclaim his love for a girl.

Notes

References

External links 
 

Films shot in Mumbai
Films shot in Agra
Films directed by Gautham Vasudev Menon
2008 films
Films shot in Tiruchirappalli
Films shot in Uttarakhand
Films shot in California
2000s Tamil-language films
Films scored by Harris Jayaraj
Indian action drama films
Films set in Tiruchirappalli
Works about the Oklahoma City bombing
Indian Army in films
Best Tamil Feature Film National Film Award winners
2008 action drama films